Tim Potter is an English actor in theatre, films and TV since the 1980s.

Career 
Potter's stage work includes playing the role of Salvador Dalí in the original production of Terry Johnson's Hysteria at the Royal Court in 1993, and Charles II in Stephen Jeffreys' The Libertine the following year. He has appeared in productions of plays by Edward Bond, Oscar Wilde, Dario Fo, Tennessee Williams, Samuel Beckett, Shakespeare, George Etherege and Jim Cartwright. and worked for directors including Sam Mendes, Phyllida Lloyd, Neil Bartlett, Ken Russell, Benjamin Ross, Julian Jarrold, Steven Berkoff, Max Stafford-Clark, Philip Prowse, Uberto Pasolini, Deborah Warner and Stephen Frears.

He was a founder member, with Jim Cartwright and Louis Mellis of Acme Acting, a theatre company which performed plays in domestic homes, using the whole house, with the audience following the actors room to room. His roles included Blanche DuBois in A Streetcar Named Desire and Col. Kurtz in Apocalypse Now.
His film roles include the Ghost of Christmas Future in A Christmas Carol (1999) opposite Patrick Stewart, Chief Gentleman in  The Prince and the Pauper (2000), and Captain Hook in Finding Neverland (2004), as well as roles in The Young Poisoner's Handbook (1995), Entrapment (1999), Faintheart (2008), Still Life (2013), and the 1999 TV movie adaptation of Alice in Wonderland.

Filmography

Film

Television

References

External links
 

British male stage actors
British male film actors
British male television actors
Living people
Year of birth missing (living people)